Isailović is a Serbian surname derived from a masculine given name Isailo. It may refer to:

Bojan Isailović (born 1980), football player
Dragan Isailović (born 1976), footballer
Ivana Isailović (born 1986), female volleyball player
Marko Isailovic (born 1996), rugby player

Serbian surnames